Catalina Castaño and Mariana Duque Mariño were the defending champions, but Castaño chose not to participate.  Duque Mariño played alongside Teliana Pereira, but lost to Anabel Medina Garrigues and Klára Zakopalová in the semifinals.
Medina Garrigues and Zakopalová went on to win the title, defeating Alexandra Dulgheru and Flavia Pennetta in the final, 6–1, 6–4.

Seeds

Draw

Draw

External Links
 Main Draw

Swedish Open - Doubles
2013 Women's Doubles
2013 in Swedish women's sport